Qaleh Juq (also Romanized as Qal‘eh Jūq and Qal‘eh-ye Jūq; also known as Qal‘a Jukh and Qal‘eh Jūg) is a village in Solduz Rural District, in the Central District of Naqadeh County, West Azerbaijan Province, Iran. At the 2006 census, its population was 158, in 37 families.

References 

Populated places in Naqadeh County